Luhanske is an urban-type settlement in Bakhmut Raion, Donetsk Oblast. Ukraine. The population of Luhanske was 

The settlement has been damaged by and is on the frontline of the War in Donbass. The UNHCR reported in February 2017 that it was inhabited by a "handful of elderly residents". The settlement was controlled by the Ukrainian army, from 2014 until the 2022 Russian invasion of Ukraine It was captured by Russia in May 2022, and remains under their control.

References

Urban-type settlements in Bakhmut Raion
Bakhmutsky Uyezd